13th of September is a district in the south of Bucharest, Romania in Sector 5, close to the city center.

History 
The name comes from the main street in the area: Calea 13 Septembrie, which is named after the date of the closing battle of the 1848 Wallachian Revolution which was fought on the nearby Dealul Spirii between the Ottoman troops and the Firemen division of Bucharest. The 13th of September is the Firefighter's Day in Romania since then.

Landmarks 
 Casa Poporului
 Panduri Hospital
 Marriott Hotel Bucharest

References 

Sector 5